Danail Andonov Petrov (born 5 February 1978 in Kazanlak) is a Bulgarian former road bicycle racer.

Major results

2001
 3rd Road race, National Road Championships
2002
 1st Stage 4 Tour de Minho
 1st Stage 10 Volta a Portugal
2004
 1st Overall Volta ao Alentejo
1st Stage 3
 3rd Overall Troféu Joaquim Agostinho
1st Stage 1
 3rd Road race, National Road Championships
2005
 3rd Overall Troféu Joaquim Agostinho
1st Stage 3
 3rd Subida al Naranco
2006
 1st Overall Troféu Joaquim Agostinho
1st Stage 3
 1st Stage 2 Tour of Bulgaria
 2nd Road race, National Road Championships
2007
 6th Overall Vuelta a Asturias
 7th Overall Clásica Internacional de Alcobendas
 8th Subida a Urkiola
 8th Subida al Naranco
2008
 1st Stage 3 GP CTT Correios de Portugal
 1st Stage 1 Troféu Joaquim Agostinho
 2nd Overall Tour of Bulgaria
1st Stages 6 & 7
 5th Overall Tour of Turkey
 7th Overall The Paths of King Nikola
2009
2nd Overall GP CTT Correios de Portugal
2010
1st  Road race, National Road Championships
5th Prueba Villafranca de Ordizia
2011
1st  Road race, National Road Championships
3rd Overall Tour of Trakya
5th Overall Tour of Isparta
1st Stage 3
7th Overall Tour of Cappadocia
8th Overall Tour of Bulgaria
10th Overall Tour du Maroc
2012
1st  Road race, National Road Championships
2nd Overall Tour of Turkey
7th Gran Premio Miguel Indurain
2013
1st  Road race, National Road Championships
4th Circuito de Getxo
7th GP Miguel Indurain
8th Vuelta a la Comunidad de Madrid
8th Overall Tour of Turkey

References

External links
 
 
 Sports Reference Profile
 Team Caja Rural Profile
 2012 Olympics Profile

Bulgarian male cyclists
1978 births
Living people
Sportspeople from Sofia
Cyclists at the 2012 Summer Olympics
Olympic cyclists of Bulgaria